Halysidota davisii, or Davis' tussock moth, is a species of moth in the family Erebidae. It was described by Henry Edwards in 1874. It is found in Utah, Arizona, New Mexico and north-western Texas.

Adults are on wing from July to August.

The larvae have been recorded feeding on Quercus emoryi and Celtis species.

Etymology
The species is named in honor of Dr. Davis.

References

 

Halysidota
Moths described in 1874